Keski-Vuosaari (Finnish), Mellersta Nordsjö (Swedish) is an eastern neighborhood of Helsinki, Finland.

Vuosaari